Daniel, Dan or Danny Kelly may refer to:

Academics
 Daniel Kelly (sociologist) (born 1959), British sociologist and nursing professor
 Daniel Kelly (philosopher) (born 1975), American philosopher
Daniel P. Kelly, American physician and Professor of Diabetes and Metabolic Diseases at the University of Pennsylvania

Entertainment
 Dan Kelly (musician) (born 1974), Australian musician
 Dan Kelly (recording artist) (1842–?), American pioneer recording artist
 Daniel Hugh Kelly (born 1952), American stage, film, and television actor
 Daniel Kelly (artist) (born 1947), American artist based in Japan
 Daniel Kelly (actor) (born 1992), Canadian actor and rapper
 Danny Kelly (BBC WM presenter) (born 1970), British radio presenter
 Danny Kelly (journalist) (born 1956), British music journalist

Sports
 Dan Kelly (fighter) (born 1977), Australian Olympic judoka and mixed martial artist
 Dan Kelly (footballer) (1904–1941), Scottish footballer
 Dan Kelly (ice hockey) (born 1989), American ice hockey defenceman
 Dan Kelly (sportscaster) (1936–1989), broadcaster best known for National Hockey League coverage
 Dan Kelly (rugby union) (born 2001), English-Irish rugby union player
 Dan P. Kelly (born 1973), National Hockey League broadcaster and son of sportscaster Dan Kelly
 Daniel Kelly (athlete) (1883–1920), American long jumper
 Daniel Kelly (Scottish footballer) (1893–1948), Scottish footballer
 Daniel Kelly (handballer) in Australia men's national handball team
 Danny Kelly (boxer), see Colombia at the 2011 Pan American Games
 Danny Kelly (footballer, born 1990), English footballer
 Danny Kelly (soccer) (born 1969), American soccer player and coach

Others
 Dan Kelly (bushranger) (1861–1880), Australian bushranger and outlaw
 Dan Kelly (poker player) (born 1989), poker player
 Daniel Kelly (Medal of Honor) (1841–1912), American Civil War soldier
 Daniel Kelly (Wisconsin judge) (born 1964), Wisconsin Supreme Court Justice
 Daniel M. Kelly (1915–1982), member of the New York State Assembly

Places
 Dan Kelly, Trinidad, a street in Laventille, Trinidad and Tobago

See also
Daniel Kelley (disambiguation)